Schwarzerium viridicyaneum is a species of beetle in the family Cerambycidae. It was described by Hayashi in 1956.

References

Callichromatini
Beetles described in 1956